Anthony Ewart Ledger Hill (14 July 1901 – 25 October 1986) was an English first-class cricketer. Hill was a right-handed batsman.

Hill made his first-class debut for Hampshire against Gloucestershire in the 1920 County Championship.

From 1920 to 1930 Hill represented the County in eighteen first-class matches, scoring 193 runs at an average of 7.42, with a top score of 24. After playing infrequently for the County, Hill played his final first-class match in the 1930 County Championship against Nottinghamshire. Hill was best remembered during his time at Hampshire as a splendid fielder.

In addition to representing Hampshire, Hill also represented the Marylebone Cricket Club in a single first-class match against Wales.

Harrison died in Winchester, Hampshire on 25 October 1986.

Family
Hill's father was the all-rounder Arthur Hill, who himself represented Hampshire in first-class cricket, as well as representing England in four Tests. His cousin, Richard Page was also a first-class cricketer.

External links
Anthony Hill at Cricinfo
Anthony Hill at CricketArchive
Matches and detailed statistics for Anthony Hill

1901 births
1986 deaths
People from Test Valley
English cricketers
Hampshire cricketers
Marylebone Cricket Club cricketers